"Hey Brother" is a 2013 song by Avicii.

Hey Brother may also refer to: 

"Hey Brother", 1968 single by Billy Preston from the album That's the Way God Planned It
"Hey Brother", 1981 single by Chanels
"Hey Brother", 1997 song by Adriana Evans on her album Adriana Evans
"Hey Brother", 2004 song by Camper Van Beethoven from the album New Roman Times
"Hey Brother", 2006 Japanese song by Rip Slyme used in the film Mamiya kyodai

See also
Hey Brothers Ice Cream, a Sterling, Illinois-based milk and ice cream producer throughout northwestern Illinois during most of the 20th century
"Hey, brother, pour the wine!" 1954 song by Ross Bagdasarian, sung by various artists including Dean Martin 
Hey, Brother, Pour the Wine, 1964 compilation album by Capitol Records released after Dean Martin moved to Reprise Records